Estadio Plaza El Coliseo is a bull-fighting stadium in Huancayo, Junin, Peru. The stadium holds 3,500 people.

External links
Entry in World Stadiums

Huancayo
Buildings and structures in Junín Region
Huancayo